1955 McMath, provisional designation , is a stony Koronis asteroid from the outer region of the asteroid belt, approximately 10 kilometers in diameter.

It was discovered on 22 September 1963, by Indiana University's Indiana Asteroid Program at its Goethe Link Observatory near Brooklyn, Indiana, United States. It was later named after solar astronomer Robert Raynolds McMath.

Orbit and classification 

McMath is a stony S-type asteroid and a member of the Koronis family, which is named after 158 Koronis and consists of about 300 known bodies. It orbits the Sun in the outer main-belt at a distance of 2.7–3.0 AU once every 4 years and 10 months (1,762 days). Its orbit has an eccentricity of 0.06 and an inclination of 1° with respect to the ecliptic. The first precovery was taken at Goethe Link Observatory in 1949, extending the asteroid's observation arc by 15 years prior to its discovery. The first (unused) observation at Uccle Observatory dates back to 1936.

Physical characteristics

Rotation period 

It has a well determined rotation period of  hours with a brightness amplitude of 0.30 in magnitude. Between 2011 and 2013, three additional lightcurves with concurring periods of McMath with an amplitude between 0.32 and 0.39 magnitude were obtained through photometric observations in the R- and S-band at the U.S. Palomar Transient Factory in California.

Diameter and albedo 

According to the survey carried out by the NEOWISE mission of NASA's Wide-field Infrared Survey Explorer, McMath measures 9.8 kilometers in diameter and its surface has a high albedo of 0.32, while the Collaborative Asteroid Lightcurve Link assumes a standard albedo for stony members of the Koronis family of 0.24, and calculates a diameter of 10.3 kilometers.

Naming 

This minor planet was named after American solar astronomer Robert Raynolds McMath (1891–1962), who was also a bridge engineer and businessman. He was a co-donor and the director of the McMath–Hulbert Observatory in Lake Angelus, Michigan, which was deeded to the University of Michigan. Under his advice, the NSF chose the site at Kitt Peak National Observatory for the McMath–Pierce Solar Telescope.

From the late 1950s, Robert McMath served as the first president of Association of Universities for Research in Astronomy and thereafter as its chairman. The lunar crater McMath is also named in his and his father's honour. The approved naming citation was published by the Minor Planet Center on 1 March 1981.

References

External links 
 Asteroid Lightcurve Database (LCDB), query form (info )
 Dictionary of Minor Planet Names, Google books
 Asteroids and comets rotation curves, CdR – Observatoire de Genève, Raoul Behrend
 Discovery Circumstances: Numbered Minor Planets (1)-(5000) – Minor Planet Center
 
 

001955
001955
Named minor planets
19630922